The Journal of Mental Health Policy and Economics is a quarterly peer-reviewed academic journal published by the International Center of Mental Health Policy and Economics. It is the official journal of the Section on Mental Health Economics of the World Psychiatric Association.It covers topics related to mental health and health economics, and in particular the financing and organisation of psychiatry services.

Abstracting and indexing 
The journal is abstracted and indexed in Index Medicus/MEDLINE/PubMed, Journal of Economic Literature/EconLit, Social Sciences Citation Index, and Current Contents/Social & Behavioral Sciences. According to the Journal Citation Reports, the journal has a 2013 impact factor of 1.406.

References

External links 
 

Economics journals
Health economics journals
Public health journals
Publications established in 1998
English-language journals
Quarterly journals